Mateo may refer to:

People
Name

 Mateo (middle name)

 Mateo (given name)
 Mateo (surname)
People named Mateo
 Mateo (singer) (born 1986), former stage name of American pop/R&B singer-songwriter

Arts, entertainment, and media
 Mateo (1937 film), a 1937 Argentine film
 Mateo (2014 film), a 2014 Colombian film
 Mateo & Matos, team of deejays and house music producers
 Mateo Santos, a character on All My Children
 Mateo, minor character on children's educational series Danger Rangers.

See also
 San Mateo (disambiguation)
 Matthew (disambiguation)